Esmailabad (also Romanized as Esmā‘īlābād; also known as Esma’il Abad Olya) is a village in Rezvan Rural District, Ferdows District, Rafsanjan County, Kerman Province, Iran. At the 2006 census, its population was 3,034, in 765 families.

References 

Populated places in Rafsanjan County